The Huveaune is a small river in the Provence-Alpes-Côte d'Azur region of southeastern France.

References

Rivers of Bouches-du-Rhône
Rivers of France
Rivers of Provence-Alpes-Côte d'Azur
0Huveaune